The 1991 Kaduna State gubernatorial election occurred on December 14, 1991. NRC's Mohammed Dabo Lere won election for a first term, defeating SDP's Ango Abdullahi.

Mohammed Dabo Lere emerged party candidate in the NRC gubernatorial primary. He picked James Bawa Magaji as his running mate. Ango Abdullahi was the SDP candidate.

Electoral system
The Governor of Kaduna State is elected using the plurality voting system.

Primary election

NRC primary
The NRC primary election produced Mohammed Dabo Lere as the party's candidate.

Candidates
Party nominee: Mohammed Dabo Lere: Winner.
Running mate: James Bawa Magaji.

SDP primary
The SDP primary election was contested by Professor Ango Abdullahi and Barr. Adamu Audu Maikori. Abdullahi won the primary run-off election polling 166,857 votes (59.7%) while his closest rival, Maikori, scored 67,312 votes (21%).

Candidates
Party nominee: Ango Abdullahi.
Running mate:  .
 Adamu Maikori

Results
There were only two political parties allowed by law, NRC and SDP. NRC candidate Mohammed Dabo Lere won election for a first term, defeating SDP's Ango Abdullahi.

References 

Kaduna State gubernatorial elections
Gubernatorial election 1991
Kaduna State gubernatorial election